Cotham School is a secondary school with academy status in Cotham, a suburb of Bristol, England. The catchment area for this school is Cotham, Clifton, Kingsdown ,southern Redland, Bishopston, St Paul’s and Easton

The school shares a sixth form, the North Bristol Post 16 Centre, with nearby Redland Green School. The Cotham campus is situated in Charnwood House, although sixth form lessons also take place at the main school site. Construction on a new teaching and dining block was finished in 2018 and increased the school's capacity significantly.

Cotham School is one of the few schools in the UK to have educated several Nobel laureates: Paul Dirac, who received the Nobel Prize in Physics in 1933, and Peter Higgs, who received the same award in 2013.

There are discussions being held regarding the merging of Cotham with Redland Green at a preliminary stage and consolidation of campus buildings.

History
Cotham School was established in 1856. Its predecessor was the Merchant Venturers' School. Until the academic year 2000/01, Cotham was a grammar school. It became a comprehensive in 2001, and an academy in September 2011. A £20m redevelopment and expansion was completed in 2012, using funding from the Building Schools for the Future programme.

The BBC drama Thirteen was filmed here in 2015.

Notable alumni
Tony Badger, Master of Clare College, Cambridge, 2003–14; Paul Mellon Professor of American History, University of Cambridge, 1992–2014.
 Paul Dirac, Lucasian Professor of Mathematics from 1932 to 1969 at the University of Cambridge, who won the 1933 Nobel Prize in Physics with Erwin Schrödinger for work on quantum mechanics.
 Wallace Fox, Professor of Community Therapeutics from 1979 to 1986 at the Cardiothoracic Institute, Royal Brompton Hospital; did important work on tuberculosis
 David Garmston, journalist
 Peter Higgs, Professor of Theoretical Physics from 1980 to 1996 at the University of Edinburgh; received the 2013 Nobel Prize in Physics with François Englert for his work on subatomic particles including the Higgs boson;
Maya Jama, TV presenter
 Martyn Jarrett, Bishop of Beverley 2000–2012; Bishop of Burnley from 1994 to 2000
 Laya Lewis, actress
 Gary Mabbutt, professional footballer for Bristol Rovers F.C., Tottenham Hotspur F.C. and England
 Arthur Milton, cricketer and footballer
John Mortimore, cricketer
 Michael Parsons, designer of bridges including the Severn and Humber Bridges
 John Perry, musician and author. Guitarist The Only Ones
 Greg Poole, artist
 Derek Robinson, novelist
 John Saxbee, Bishop of Lincoln 2001–2011; Bishop of Ludlow from 1994 to 2001
 Julian Sedgwick, actor
 John Tidmarsh, journalist
 Amy Willerton, contestant on I'm a Celebrity 2013 and contestant in Miss Universe
Russell Wood, cricketer

See also
Education in England

References

External links

 

Secondary schools in Bristol
Academies in Bristol
Educational institutions established in 1856
1856 establishments in England